Fincastle is an unincorporated community in Brown County, in the U.S. state of Ohio.

History
Fincastle was platted in 1835, and named after Fincastle, Virginia. A post office called Fincastle was established in 1836, and remained in operation until 1967.

References

Unincorporated communities in Brown County, Ohio
1835 establishments in Ohio
Populated places established in 1835
Unincorporated communities in Ohio